Versatile may refer to:

In botany, versatile refers to anthers that swing freely at their attachment to the filament
Versatile (sex), person who enjoys both being dominant and submissive, and may alternate between the two in sexual situations

Entertainment
Versatile (producer), real name of Andrew Roettger, American record producer, songwriter and remixer
The Versatiles, a Jamaican reggae group
Versatile (Van Morrison album), 2017
Versatile (Pop Evil album), 2021
"Versatile", a song by Claude Bolling from Suite for Flute and Jazz Piano Trio 1973
"Versatile", a song by Pansy Division from Undressed (Pansy Division album), 1993
"Versatile", a song by Jermaine Stewart from Frantic Romantic, 1986
"Versatile", a song by Baba Dee from The Headies 2007
"Versatile", a song by Kodak Black from Project Baby 2, 2017

Other
, a Royal Navy destroyer that saw service in both world wars
Versatile (company), Canadian manufacturing company and brand of agricultural equipment by the company

See also
Versatile Multilayer Disc aka VMD or HD VMD, a high-capacity red laser optical disc technology